The Asian Badminton Championships is a tournament organized by the Badminton Asia Confederation to crown the best badminton players in Asia. There were two championships in 1976, one of them was unofficial/invitational. Further editions of Invitation Asian championships were held in 1977, 1978 and 1988. Below is the list of the individual medalists at the Badminton Asia Championships since 1962.

Men's singles

Women's singles

Men's doubles

Women's doubles

Mixed doubles

References
 bernd-volker-brahms.de

!